Bio2RDF is a biological database that uses semantic web technologies to provide interlinked life science data.

See also
 DBpedia
 RDF
 Semantic web

References

External links
 https://web.archive.org/web/20070714231822/http://bio2rdf.org/

Biological databases
Semantic Web